is an underground railway station in the city of Nagano, Japan, operated by the private railway operating company Nagano Electric Railway.

Lines
Shiyakushomae Station is a station on the Nagano Electric Railway Nagano Line and is 0.4 kilometers from the terminus of the line at Nagano Station.

Station layout
The station is an underground staffed station consisting of two opposed side platforms serving two tracks. There are two entrances, North and South, to the station. The southern entrance has limited operating hours.

Platforms

History
The station opened June 24, 1928, between Nagano and Gondo, with the name Kojimachi Station. 
On March 1, 1981, the line was moved underground.

Adjacent stations

Passenger statistics
In fiscal 2016, the station was used by an average of 593 passengers daily (boarding passengers only).

Surrounding area
Nagano City Hall

TOiGo
NTT DoCoMo Nagano Building
Monzen Plaza

Gallery

See also
 List of railway stations in Japan

References

External links

 

Railway stations in Japan opened in 1928
Railway stations in Nagano (city)
Nagano Electric Railway